Raphael Ernest Grail Armattoe (12 August 1913 – 22 December 1953) was a Ghanaian medical doctor, author, poet and politician. He was nominated for the 1949 Nobel Prize in Medicine and Physiology and was a campaigner for unification of British and French Togoland. He was called by the New York Post "the 'Irishman' from West Africa", and the BBC producer Henry Swanzy referred to him as the "African Paracelsus".

Biography

Early life and education
Armattoe was born at Keta in the Gold Coast (in what is now the Volta Region of Ghana). As Togoland changed from German to British and French hands, Armattoe ended up being fluent in German, French and English. He also spoke his native Ewe language. After his basic education in the Gold Coast, he left for Germany in 1930 for further studies. Most of his tertiary education was in Germany and France. He apparently left Germany for France due to rising Nazism. He continued his studies in anthropology, literature and Medicine at the Sorbonne.

Medicine
Armattoe moved to Edinburgh, where he qualified to practice medicine. He got a locum job in Belfast, Northern Ireland, and following that worked at the Civil Defence first-aid post in Brooke Park, Derry, between 1939 and 1945. After the Second World War, he opened a medical practice at his home on Northland Road in Derry. He later became the director of a research institute. His research into the use of the abochi drug against human parasites led to his nomination for the Nobel Prize in Physiology or Medicine in 1948. At this stage, he started being more involved with writing and giving talks, especially relating to anthropology. He was described by some who knew him as a marvellous doctor and a good speaker.

Writing and research
Armattoe started devoting more time to writing. He established the Lomeshie Research Centre, named after his mother. In 1947, he attended the Nobel Prize laureation ceremonies with his friend Erwin Schrödinger, who won the Nobel Prize in Physics in 1933. Schrödinger later wrote the foreword for Armattoe's book The Golden Age of West African Civilization. Armattoe later successfully applied for an anthropological research grant worth £3,000 at the time from the Wenner-Gren Foundation for Anthropological Research. In 1948 he returned to West Africa, where he conducted his research mainly on Ewe physical anthropology. He presented his findings in 1949 and was nominated for the Nobel Peace prize for medicine and physiology. The prize was eventually won by John Boyd Orr, 1st Baron Boyd-Orr, a medical doctor and the director of the United Nations Food and Agriculture Organization at the time.

Poetry
After his return to the Gold Coast, Armattoe set up a medical clinic at Kumasi in the Ashanti Region. He also turned his attention to poetry, writing and politics. His first collection of poems was Between the Forest and the Sea (1950). His next collection, Deep Down in the Black Man's Mind, was published in 1954, after his death.

Politics
Armattoe and Kwame Nkrumah first met at the 1945 Pan-African Congress in Manchester. Though they both favoured independence for the colonies, Nkrumah was centrist while Armattoe was federalist. He joined the Ghana Congress Party rather than Nkrumah's Convention People's Party. Armattoe belonged to the Ewe ethnic group and campaigned for the Ewe people divided by colonial powers into British Togoland, the southern part of the Gold Coast and French Togoland to be united as one Ewe nation-state. He was also active with the Togoland Congress, which advocated Ewe unification.

Death
In 1953, Armattoe travelled to New York City leading a delegation to address the United Nations about the "Eweland question", seeking international support for a union between British and French Togo. On his way back to the Gold Coast, he visited his daughter Irusia, at the time a student in Dublin, Republic of Ireland, and then Germany. He fell ill and died in a hospital in Hamburg. His wife reported that he said he had been poisoned by some unknown persons. He had apparently been attacked previously by supporters of Kwame Nkrumah.

Family
Armattoe was married to Swiss-born Leonie Schwartz, who was also known as "Marina". They had two daughters, the elder, Irusia, being born in Derry. Armattoe and his family lived at Kumasi in Ghana until his death. His father, Robert Glikpo Armattoe, was a merchant who traded mainly with the Germans and also studied local indigenous languages.

Legacy
A blue plaque in his honour was unveiled by the Ulster History Circle at 7 Northland Road, Derry, where Armattoe lived from 1939 to 1945 and carried on his practice as a GP.

Essays and publications

References

External links and sources
Amazon book search
 "Dr. Raphael Ernest Grail Armattoe (1913–1953): Physician and writer", Dictionary of Ulster Biography.

1913 births
1953 deaths
Ghanaian general practitioners
University of Paris alumni
Ghana Congress Party politicians
Ghanaian male poets
20th-century Ghanaian poets
Ewe people
Ghanaian expatriates in France
20th-century male writers